Andrew Riley (born 6 September 1988, Saint Thomas, Jamaica) is a Jamaican sprinter, mainly competing in the 110 m hurdles and more recently 100 metres. He won the gold medal in the 110 m at the 2014 Commonwealth Games.  He went pro signing with Puma SE shortly after his collegiate career.

Competition record

References

External links

Illinois Fighting Illini bio

1988 births
Living people
Jamaican male sprinters
Illinois Fighting Illini men's track and field athletes
Athletes (track and field) at the 2012 Summer Olympics
Athletes (track and field) at the 2016 Summer Olympics
Olympic athletes of Jamaica
Athletes (track and field) at the 2014 Commonwealth Games
World Athletics Championships athletes for Jamaica
Commonwealth Games gold medallists for Jamaica
Commonwealth Games medallists in athletics
People from Saint Thomas Parish, Jamaica
Medallists at the 2014 Commonwealth Games